The 1946–47 season was Real Madrid Club de Fútbol's 44th season in existence and the club's 15th consecutive season in the top flight of Spanish football.

Summary
During summer Bernabeu appointed Baltasar Albeniz from Español as new head coach for the upcoming season. The squad was reinforced with Arsuaga, Ferrús, Rodriguez Gallardo, Sureda and future club legend Luis Molowny whom transfer rights President Bernabeu bought 'in extremis' sending his club manager Jacinto Quincoces by airplane to Las Palmas just before the arrival of FC Barcelona manager Ricardo Cabot by boat travel.

In the league, the squad reached the first spot several rounds aimed by Pruden goals, however, the team collapsed by the second part of the season finishing on 7th place.

The club clinched back-to-back cup champions winning its ninth 1947 Copa del Generalísimo Final against Español.

Squad

Transfers

Competitions

La Liga

Position by round

League table

Matches

Copa del Generalísimo

Statistics

Squad statistics

Players statistics

References

Real Madrid CF seasons
Real Madrid CF